Sutilizona is a genus of sea snails, marine gastropod mollusks in the family Sutilizonidae.

Species
Species within the genus Sutilizona include:
 Sutilizona pterodon Warén & Bouchet, 2001
 Sutilizona theca McLean, 1989
 Sutilizona tunnicliffae Warén & Bouchet, 2001

References

 Geiger D.L. (2012) Monograph of the little slit shells. Volume 1. Introduction, Scissurellidae. pp. 1-728. Volume 2. Anatomidae, Larocheidae, Depressizonidae, Sutilizonidae, Temnocinclidae. pp. 729-1291. Santa Barbara Museum of Natural History Monographs Number 7

External links
 McLean, J.H. (1989). New slit-limpets (Scissurellacea and Fissurellacea) from hydrothermal vents. Part 1: Systematic descriptions and comparisons based on shell and radular characters. Contributions in Science, Natural History Museum of Los Angeles County. 407: 1–29

Sutilizonidae